Acenaphthoquinone is a quinone derived from acenaphthene. It is a water-insoluble yellow solid. It is a precursor to some agrichemicals and dyes.

Preparation
The compound is prepared in the laboratory by oxidation of acenaphthene with potassium dichromate. Commercially, oxidation is effected with peroxide.  Over-oxidation gives naphthalenedicarboxylic anhydride.

References

External links
 National Pollutant Inventory - Polycyclic Aromatic Hydrocarbon Fact Sheet
 PAHs - including structural diagrams
 Entry at ChemicalLand21.com

Quinones
Polycyclic aromatic compounds
Enones